The following is a list of major sports venues in Faisalabad, Pakistan
Iqbal Stadium: International Cricket Stadium Situated near DCO office.
Faisalabad Hockey Stadium: International Hockey Stadium Situated in Madina town.
Lyallpur Gym Khana 
Aqua Water Park

See also
 List of stadiums in Pakistan
 List of cricket grounds in Pakistan
 List of sports venues in Karachi
 List of sports venues in Lahore

Faisalabad
Faisalabad-related lists
Faisalabad